Central Graded School, also known as Central School, is a historic school building located at Union, Union County, South Carolina.  It was built in 1891, and is a two-story, "T"-shaped Richardsonian Romanesque style brick building with the square bell tower.  Rear additions were built in 1899, 1904, and about 1930.

The building was added to the National Register of Historic Places in 1978. It is currently used by the University of South Carolina Union.

References

School buildings on the National Register of Historic Places in South Carolina
Romanesque Revival architecture in South Carolina
School buildings completed in 1891
Buildings and structures in Union County, South Carolina
National Register of Historic Places in Union County, South Carolina